is a former Japanese football player. She played for Japan national team.

Club career
Homma was born on November 5, 1964. She played for Shimizudaihachi SC and Shizuoka Koki LSC.

National team career
In June 1981, Homma was selected by the Japan national team for the 1981 AFC Championship. At this competition, on June 7, she debuted against Chinese Taipei. This match was the Japan team's first match in an International A Match. She played three games for Japan in 1981.

National team statistics

References

1964 births
Living people
Japanese women's footballers
Japan women's international footballers
Shimizudaihachi Pleiades players
Women's association footballers not categorized by position